Plotnikovo is a rural locality (a village) in Asovskoye Rural Settlement, Beryozovsky District, Perm Krai, Russia. The population was 137 as of 2010.

Geography 
Plotnikovo is located on the Sosnovka River, 33 km southeast of  Beryozovka (the district's administrative centre) by road. Sosnovka is the nearest rural locality.

References 

Rural localities in Perm Krai